Ditheko Absalom Mototo (born 27 December 1980, in Port Elizabeth, Eastern Cape) is retired a South African association football left-back. He last played for Vasco da Gama in the Premier Soccer League.
He joined Vasco in 2010.
His previous clubs were: Bloemfontein Celtic, Kaizer Chiefs, Bloemfontein Young Tigers.

Club career

Kaizer Chiefs
Mototo made his debut on 27 November 2005 in a 1–1 draw against Supersport United. He scored his first goal on 3 December 2005 in a 2–2 draw against Ajax Cape Town. He assisted David Obua's goal on his Soweto derby debut on 11 December 2005.

References

1980 births
South African soccer players
Living people
Sportspeople from Port Elizabeth
Association football defenders
Kaizer Chiefs F.C. players
Bloemfontein Celtic F.C. players
Soccer players from the Eastern Cape